The Hudinja is a river in Styria, Slovenia. The river passes Vitanje, Socka Castle, Vojnik, and Celje, where it flows into the Voglajna. A district of Celje also named Hudinja lies on the river.

References

External links

Rivers of Styria (Slovenia)
Rivers of Celje